Aliaksandra Kalaur (born 11 June 2001) is a Belarusian sprint canoeist.

She competed at the 2021 ICF Canoe Sprint World Championships, winning a gold medal in the C-4 500 m distance.

References

External links

2001 births
Living people
Belarusian female canoeists
ICF Canoe Sprint World Championships medalists in Canadian
21st-century Belarusian women